The Polish men's national under 20 ice hockey team is the national under-20 ice hockey team in Poland. The team represents Poland at the International Ice Hockey Federation's World Junior Hockey Championship Division I. Poland first played at the World Juniors in 1977, and throughout the 1980s moved between the Pool A and B, before dropping down in the 1990s. They last played at the top level in the 1997 World Juniors.

International competitions

World Junior Championships

References

External links
Official website
IIHF profile

Junior national ice hockey teams
Ice hockey